Randwick Petersham Cricket Club, also known as the Randy Petes, competes in the Sydney Grade Cricket competition in Grades 1 to 5, Poidevin Gray (under-21) and AW Green Shield (under-16). It also fields two sides in the Sydney Metropolitan competition.

Established in 2001 following a merger between Randwick Cricket Club and Petersham-Marrickville District CC, the Randy Petes have been highly successful winning two Club Championships (2007/08 and 2010/11) and premierships across Grades 1 to 6. The club have produced many state cricketers, including New South Wales and Cricket Australia XI player Jason Sangha, and Australian Test players Simon Katich, Nathan Hauritz, Usman Khawaja and David Warner, as well as Sydney Sixers and NSW all rounder Daniel Sams.

In February 2018, Carly Leeson became the first female cricketer to play in a men's grade cricket for Randwick Petersham.

References

External links
 

Sydney Grade Cricket clubs
Cricket clubs established in 2001
2001 establishments in Australia
Coogee, New South Wales
Randwick, New South Wales